František Čermák and Leoš Friedl were the defending champions, but Čermák did not compete this year. Friedl teamed up with Andrei Pavel and successfully defended his title, by defeating Christophe Rochus and Olivier Rochus 6–2, 6–7(5–7), 6–0 in the final.

Seeds

Draw

Draw

References

External links
 Official results archive (ATP)
 Official results archive (ITF)

Austrian Open - Doubles